Duke of Hamilton is a title in the Peerage of Scotland, created in April 1643. It is the senior dukedom in that peerage (except for the Dukedom of Rothesay held by the Sovereign's eldest son), and as such its holder is the premier peer of Scotland, as well as being head of both the House of Hamilton and the House of Douglas. The title, the town of Hamilton in Lanarkshire, and many places around the world are named after members of the Hamilton family. The ducal family's surname, originally "Hamilton", is now "Douglas-Hamilton". Since 1711, the dukedom has been held together with the Dukedom of Brandon in the Peerage of Great Britain, and the dukes since that time have been styled Duke of Hamilton and Brandon, along with several other subsidiary titles.

Overview

The titles held by the current duke of Hamilton and Brandon are:

Peerage of Scotland
 16th Duke of Hamilton (created 1643)
 13th Marquess of Douglas (created 1633)
 16th Marquess of Clydesdale (created 1643)
 23rd Earl of Angus (created 1389)
 13th Earl of Angus (created 1633)
 15th Earl of Lanark (created 1639)
 16th Earl of Arran and Cambridge (created 1643)
 13th Lord Abernethy and Jedburgh Forest (created 1633)
 15th Lord Machanshyre and Polmont (created 1639)
 16th Lord Aven and Innerdale (created 1643)

Peerage of Great Britain
 13th Duke of Brandon, in the County of Suffolk (created 1711)
 13th Baron Dutton, in the County of Chester (created 1711)

Other offices and duties
The duke of Hamilton and Brandon is the hereditary keeper of the Palace of Holyroodhouse, the official royal residence in Scotland, where he maintains large private quarters. He is also, as Lord Abernethy and in this respect successor to the Gaelic earls of Fife, the hereditary bearer of the Crown of Scotland, a role which the 15th duke performed at the inauguration of the Scottish Parliament in 1999, as did the 16th duke at the State Opening of Parliament, 30 June 2011. Traditionally, the duke of Hamilton enjoys the exclusive right to remove the Scottish Crown Jewels from the City of Edinburgh. He also regularly attends sittings in the Court of Lord Lyon as an hereditary assessor, sitting on the bench beside Lord Lyon.

Courtesy titles
The courtesy titles used by heirs apparent are "Marquess of Douglas and Clydesdale" (the eldest son of the duke) and "Earl of Angus" (the eldest son of a marquess of Douglas and Clydesdale).  No duke has had a great-grandson in direct line to the titles, but it is likely that the latter would be styled "Lord Abernethy" (the Lordship of Abernethy and Jedburgh Forest being the most senior available title).

Before the dukes succeeded to the Marquessate of Douglas and its subsidiary titles, the heirs apparent were styled initially "Earl of Arran" (which had previously been used as a courtesy title by the marquesses of Hamilton) and later "Marquess of Clydesdale" (the former style then being adopted for a grandson in direct line).  The heir apparent to the Earldom of Lanark (before that title merged with the dukedom) was styled "Lord Polmont".

Multiple dukedoms
The duke of Hamilton and Brandon is one of only five British peers to hold more than one dukedom, the others being:
 the Prince of Wales (who is Duke of Cornwall, Duke of Rothesay, and Duke of Cambridge);
 the Duke of Buccleuch and Queensberry;
 the Duke of Argyll (who holds two Dukedoms of Argyll); and
 the Duke of Richmond, Lennox and Gordon

Historically, several other peers have held multiple dukedoms, including the Duke of Newcastle upon Tyne and Newcastle-under-Lyne, the Duke of Argyll and Greenwich, the Duke of Monmouth and Buccleuch and the two Dukes of Queensberry and Dover and some other mainly royal dukes.

House of Hamilton

Lairds of Cadzow

Gilbert de Hameldun is recorded as witnessing a charter confirming the gift of the church at Cragyn to the Abbey of Paisley in 1271. His ancestry is uncertain but he may have been the son of William de Hamilton (third son of Robert de Beaumont, 3rd Earl of Leicester) and Mary of Strathearn. Gilbert de Hameldun married Isabella Randolph, daughter of Thomas Randolph of Strathdon, Chamberlain of Scotland. His heir was Walter fitz Gilbert. He was governor of Bothwell Castle for the English Crown during the First War of Scottish Independence. Following the Battle of Bannockburn in 1314, he gave refuge to the Earl of Hertford and other escapees, only to deliver them and Bothwell up to Edward Bruce. He then became a Bruce partisan. Sometime between 1315 and 1329, Robert the Bruce knighted him and granted him lands in Renfrewshire and the Lothians and Cadzow (present day Hamilton in Lanarkshire), including Cadzow Castle. The lands had previously belonged to John Comyn, who was murdered by Robert the Bruce.

The 1st laird of Cadzow was succeeded as 2nd laird by his son Sir David fitz Walter. He was a supporter of King David II and fought at the Battle of Neville's Cross (Battle of Durham) where he was captured along with the King. His son David Hamilton, the 3rd laird, was the first to establish Hamilton as the family name. David Hamilton's son Sir John Hamilton became the 4th laird and was in turn succeeded as 5th laird by his son James Hamilton.

Lords Hamilton and Earls of Arran

The 5th laird was succeeded as 6th laird by his son, Sir James Hamilton, who was created a Lord of Parliament as Lord Hamilton on 3 July 1445. In early 1474, he married Princess Mary, Countess of Arran, daughter of King James II and widow of Thomas Boyd, 1st Earl of Arran. He was succeeded by his only legitimate son, James, 2nd Lord Hamilton. In 1490, then aged 15, he married the 13-year-old Elizabeth, Lady Hay, daughter of Alexander Home, 2nd Lord Home and widow of Sir Thomas Hay, Master of Yester, son and heir of John Hay, 1st Lord Hay of Yester. However, it was later discovered that Sir Thomas Hay was still alive and the marriage was annulled. The 2nd Lord married secondly Janet, Lady Livingstone, daughter of Sir David Beaton of Creich and widow of Sir Robert Livingstone of Easter Wemyss and Drumry. He became a Privy Counsellor to King James IV, and helped to arrange his marriage to Princess Margaret, daughter of King Henry VII of England. As a reward he was created Earl of Arran on 8 August 1503. He was succeeded by his elder son from his second marriage, James, 2nd Earl of Arran. He was Regent of Scotland between 1542 and 1554, and guardian of the young Mary, Queen of Scots. He was created Duc de Châtellerault in the Peerage of France in 1548 for his part in arranging the marriage of Queen Mary to Francis, Dauphin of France. This French Dukedom was forfeit when he switched allegiances in 1559. Emperor Napoleon III "confirmed" this title for the 12th Duke of Hamilton in the 19th century, but although the 12th Duke was heir male of the 2nd Earl, the legal effect of this "confirmation" is doubtful.

The 2nd Earl was succeeded by his eldest son, James, 3rd Earl of Arran, who had been proposed as a husband to Queen Elizabeth I of England in 1561. In 1562 he was declared insane, and in 1581 he resigned the Earldom to James Stewart of Bothwellhaugh. However, in 1586 his resignation was ruled by the Court of Session to be the act of a madman and his honours were restored.

Marquesses and Dukes of Hamilton

The 3rd Earl's younger brother John Hamilton (who was styled Lord Hamilton as is traditional for the younger sons of Earls) was appointed to administer his brother's estates. He was created Marquess of Hamilton, Earl of Arran and Lord Aven on 17 April 1599. His son, James, 2nd Marquess of Hamilton (who had been created Lord Aberbrothwick (or Arbroath) on 5 May 1608, before he succeeded) moved to England with King James VI, and invested into the Somers Isles Company, an offshoot of the Virginia Company, buying the shares of Lucy Russell, Countess of Bedford. The Parish of Hamilton in the Somers Isles (now Bermuda) is named for him. Upon the death of his uncle in 1609 he succeeded as 4th Earl of Arran (of the 1503 creation) and 5th Lord Hamilton. He was also created Earl of Cambridge and Baron Innerdale in the Peerage of England on 16 June 1619.

His son, James, 3rd Marquess of Hamilton, was created Duke of Hamilton, Marquess of Clydesdale, Earl of Arran and Cambridge and Lord Aven and Innerdale on 12 April 1643, with a special remainder allowing succession through the female line should his and his brother's heirs male fail. His son, Charles, Earl of Arran, died young and the 1st Duke's titles passed to his younger brother, William, 2nd Duke of Hamilton, who had already been created Earl of Lanark and Lord Machanshire and Polmont on 31 March 1639. A surrender and regrant in 1650 allowed these also to be inherited by the 1st Duke's elder daughter. Upon his death in 1651, with no further heirs in the immediate male line, the Dukedom (and the titles created with it), as well as the Earldom of Lanark (and the title created with it), passed to that daughter, Anne, 3rd Duchess of Hamilton. The 1503 Earldom of Arran and the Lordship of Hamilton became dormant, and all the other titles (the Marquessate of Hamilton, the 1599 Earldom of Arran and the Lordships of Hamilton, Aven and Aberbrothwick in the Peerage of Scotland, and the Earldom of Cambridge and the Barony of Innerdale in the Peerage of England) became extinct.

In 1656, the 3rd Duchess married William Douglas, 1st Earl of Selkirk, third son of William Douglas, 1st Marquess of Douglas. He had been created Earl of Selkirk and Lord Daer and Shortcleuch on 4 August 1646. He changed his surname to "Hamilton", and on 20 September 1660 was created Duke of Hamilton, Marquess of Clydesdale, Earl of Arran, Lanark and Selkirk and Lord Aven, Machanshire, Polmont and Daer for life. In 1688, he resigned the Earldom of Selkirk and the Lordship of Daer and Shortcleuch, and those titles were regranted to his second son, with a special remainder designed to prevent them becoming merged with the Dukedom. (See Earl of Selkirk for the subsequent history of those titles, which were eventually inherited by the 12th Duke of Hamilton, becoming separated again from the Dukedom on the death of the 13th Duke in 1940).

On 9 July 1698, the 3rd Duchess resigned all her titles in favour of her eldest son, James, Earl of Arran, who thereby succeeded as 4th Duke in his mother's lifetime (his father had died in 1694). During the lead up to the Acts of Union 1707, the 4th Duke was the leader of the anti-union party. He was created Duke of Brandon, in the County of Suffolk, and Baron Dutton, in the County of Chester, in the Peerage of Great Britain on 10 September 1711, but was wrongfully refused a summons to the Parliament of Great Britain under that title (although he continued to sit as a representative peer). He was killed in a celebrated duel with Charles Mohun, 4th Baron Mohun (who also died) in Hyde Park in London on 15 November 1712.

The 4th Duke's son James, 5th Duke of Hamilton was succeeded by his son James, 6th Duke of Hamilton and he by his son James, 7th Duke of Hamilton. In 1761, the 7th Duke's second cousin twice removed, Archibald Douglas, 1st Duke of Douglas, died without an heir. As the Duke of Hamilton, though still using the surname "Hamilton", was patrilineally a "Douglas" (through the 3rd Duchess's husband), the 7th Duke became heir male of the House of Douglas and inherited the Duke of Douglas's subsidiary titles (although not the Dukedom), succeeding as 4th Marquess of Douglas, 14th and 4th Earl of Angus and 4th Lord Abernethy and Jedburgh Forest. He died without issue and was succeeded by his brother Douglas, 8th Duke of Hamilton. He left no sons and the title passed back to his uncle, the 6th Duke's brother, Archibald, 9th Duke of Hamilton. He was succeeded by his son Alexander, 10th Duke of Hamilton and then by his son William, 11th Duke of Hamilton. The 11th Duke's son William, 12th Duke of Hamilton (who changed his surname to "Hamilton Douglas") died without a male heir and the Dukedom passed to his fourth cousin Alfred, 13th Duke of Hamilton, who was descended from the 4th Duke of Hamilton and whose line of the family had adopted the surname "Douglas-Hamilton". His son was Douglas, 14th Duke of Hamilton, who was succeeded by his son Angus, 15th Duke of Hamilton. He died in 2010, and was succeeded by his son, the current Duke, Alexander, 16th Duke of Hamilton.

Succession to the Dukedom of Hamilton 

The letters patent that created the Dukedom of Hamilton contained a special remainder. It stipulated that the Dukedom should descend to:

 heirs male of the body of the grantee, failing which to
 the grantee's brother and heirs male of the body of the grantee's brother, failing which to
 the grantee's eldest daughter and heirs male of her body, failing which to
 nearest heirs whatsoever of the grantee.

As the first Duke and his brother (the second Duke) both died without surviving sons, the succession has since 1651 been governed by the third rule given, with the dukedom going to the grantee's daughter (the third Duchess) and her heirs male.

House of Douglas

George Douglas, an illegitimate son of William Douglas, 1st Earl of Douglas, was created Earl of Angus on 9 April 1389.

His descendant, William, 11th Earl of Angus, was created Marquess of Douglas, Earl of Angus and Lord Abernethy and Jedburgh Forest on 14 June 1633.

His great-grandson, Archibald, 3rd Marquess of Douglas, was created Duke of Douglas, Marquess of Angus and Abernethy, Viscount of Jedburgh Forest and Lord Douglas of Bonkill, Prestoun and Robertoun on 10 April 1703.

He died, married but childless, in 1761, at which point the Dukedom of Douglas (and the titles created with it) became extinct, but the Marquessate of Douglas, both Earldoms of Angus and the Lordship of Abernethy and Jedburgh Forest passed to his second cousin twice removed and heir male, James Hamilton, 7th Duke of Hamilton.

Arms

The arms of the current Duke of Hamilton and Brandon are: quarterly: 1st and 4th grand quarters: quarterly: 1st and 4th, Gules three Cinquefoils Ermine (for Hamilton); 2nd and 3rd, Argent a Lymphad with the sails furled proper flagged Gules (for Arran); 2nd and 3rd grand quarters: Argent a Heart Gules imperially crowned Or on a Chief Azure three Mullets of the first (for Douglas).

The achievement has two crests, namely: 1st, on a Ducal Coronet an Oak Tree rutted and penetrated transversely in the main stem by a Frame Saw proper the frame Or (for Hamilton); 2nd, on a Chapeau Gules turned up Ermine a Salamander in flames proper (for Douglas). The supporters are: on either side an Antelope Argent armed unguled ducally gorged and chained Or. Each crest has a motto, namely "Through" (over the 1st crest) and "Jamais Arriere" ("Never Behind") (over the 2nd crest).

List of titleholders

Lairds of Cadzow (c. 1315)
 Sir Walter fitz Gilbert, 1st of Cadzow (c. 1250– bef. 1336)
 Sir David fitz Walter, 2nd of Cadzow (c. 1310–1374/1378)
 Sir David Hamilton, 3rd of Cadzow (c. 1333–c. 1392)
 Sir John Hamilton, 4th of Cadzow (died bef. 1410)
 Sir James Hamilton, 5th of Cadzow (died bef. 1441)
 Sir James Hamilton, 6th of Cadzow (died 1479) (created Lord Hamilton in 1445)

Lords Hamilton (1445)
 James Hamilton, 1st Lord Hamilton (died 1479)
 James Hamilton, 2nd Lord Hamilton (c.1475–1529) (created Earl of Arran in 1503)

Earls of Arran, second Creation (1503)
 James Hamilton, 1st Earl of Arran (c. 1475–1529)
 James Hamilton, 2nd Earl of Arran (1515–1575) (also Duke of Châtellerault in the French nobility from 1548 until 1559)
 James Hamilton, 3rd Earl of Arran (1533/1538–1609) (under attainder 1579–1585)
 James Hamilton, 4th Earl of Arran (1589–1625) (had already succeeded as 2nd Marquess of Hamilton)

Marquesses of Hamilton (1599)
 John Hamilton, 1st Marquess of Hamilton (c. 1535–1604) (created Marquess of Hamilton in the lifetime of his elder brother, the 3rd Earl of Arran)
 James Hamilton, 2nd Marquess of Hamilton, 1st Earl of Cambridge (1589–1625) (succeeded as 4th Earl of Arran in 1609)
 James Hamilton, 3rd Marquess of Hamilton, 2nd Earl of Cambridge (1606–1649) (created Duke of Hamilton in 1643)
 Charles Hamilton, Earl of Arran (1634–1640) (eldest son of the 3rd Marquess, predeceased his father in childhood)

Dukes of Hamilton (1643)
 James Hamilton, 1st Duke of Hamilton, 2nd Earl of Cambridge (1606–1649)
 Charles Hamilton, Earl of Arran (died 1640)
 William Hamilton, 2nd Duke of Hamilton, 3rd Earl of Cambridge (1616–1651)
 James Hamilton, Lord Polmont (died 1648)
 Anne Hamilton, 3rd Duchess of Hamilton (c. 1631–1716) (resigned the Dukedom in her son's favour in 1698)
m. William Douglas later Hamilton, Duke of Hamilton, 1st Earl of Selkirk (1635–1694) (created Duke of Hamilton for life in 1660)
 James Hamilton, 4th Duke of Hamilton, 1st Duke of Brandon (1658–1712) (created Duke of Brandon in 1711)
 James Hamilton, 5th Duke of Hamilton, 2nd Duke of Brandon (1703–1743)
 James Hamilton, 6th Duke of Hamilton, 3rd Duke of Brandon (1724–1758)
 James Hamilton, 7th Duke of Hamilton, 4th Duke of Brandon (1755–1769) (succeeded as 4th Marquess of Douglas in 1761)
 Douglas Hamilton, 8th Duke of Hamilton, 5th Duke of Brandon (1756–1799)
 Archibald Hamilton, 9th Duke of Hamilton, 6th Duke of Brandon (1740–1819)
 Alexander Hamilton, 10th Duke of Hamilton, 7th Duke of Brandon (1767–1852)
 William Hamilton, 11th Duke of Hamilton, 8th Duke of Brandon (1811–1863)
 William Alexander Louis Stephen Douglas-Hamilton, 12th Duke of Hamilton, 9th Duke of Brandon, 8th Earl of Selkirk (1845–1895)
 Alfred Douglas Douglas-Hamilton, 13th Duke of Hamilton, 10th Duke of Brandon, 9th Earl of Selkirk (1862–1940)
 Douglas Douglas-Hamilton, 14th Duke of Hamilton, 11th Duke of Brandon (1903–1973)
 Angus Alan Douglas Douglas-Hamilton, 15th Duke of Hamilton, 12th Duke of Brandon (1938–2010)
 Alexander Douglas Douglas-Hamilton, 16th Duke of Hamilton, 13th Duke of Brandon (born 1978)

Line of succession
 Douglas Charles Douglas-Hamilton, Marquess of Douglas and Clydesdale (born 2012) (son of the 16th Duke)
 Lord William Frederick Douglas-Hamilton (born 2014) (second son of the 16th Duke)
 Lord Basil George Douglas-Hamilton (born 2016) (third son of the 16th Duke)
 Lord John William Douglas-Hamilton (born 1979) (younger brother of the 16th Duke)
 James Alexander Douglas-Hamilton, Baron Selkirk of Douglas (born 1942) (second son of the 14th Duke)
 John Andrew Douglas-Hamilton, Lord Daer (born 1978) (eldest son of life peer, Baron Selkirk of Douglas (who disclaimed The Earldom of Selkirk for himself))
 The Hon. Charles Douglas Douglas-Hamilton (born 1979) (second son of Baron Selkirk of Douglas)
 The Hon. James Robert Douglas-Hamilton (born 1981) (third son of Baron Selkirk of Douglas) (elder twin)
 The Hon. Harry Alexander Douglas-Hamilton (born 1981) (fourth son of Baron Selkirk of Douglas) (younger twin)
 Brendan Thomas Douglas-Hamilton (born 1974) (only son of Lord Hugh Malcolm Douglas-Hamilton, third son of the 14th Duke)
 Lord Patrick George Douglas-Hamilton (born 1950) (fourth son of the 14th Duke)
 Alasdair Malcolm Douglas-Hamilton (born 1939) (elder son of Lord Malcolm Avondale Douglas-Hamilton, third son of the 13th Duke)
 Angus Gavin Douglas-Hamilton (born 1968) (elder son of Alasdair Malcolm Douglas-Hamilton)
 William Niall Douglas-Hamilton (born 1999) (only son of Angus Gavin Douglas-Hamilton)
 Geordie Fergus Douglas-Hamilton (born 1969) (younger son of Alasdair Malcolm Douglas-Hamilton)
 Diarmaid Hugh Douglas-Hamilton (born 1940) (elder son of Lord David Douglas-Hamilton, fourth son of the 13th Duke)
 Iain Douglas-Hamilton (born 1942) (younger son of Lord David Douglas-Hamilton)
 John Gavin Douglas-Hamilton (born 1957) (a great-great-grandson of Francis Seymour Douglas-Hamilton, a younger brother of the 13th Duke's father)
 Cecil Seymour Douglas-Hamilton (born 1916) (a great-grandson of Francis Seymour Douglas-Hamilton)

The next heir is (under provision 4 of the special remainder) the heir whatsoever of the 3rd Duchess, namely Edward Stanley, 19th Earl of Derby (born 1962) (a descendant of the 6th Duke through his only daughter, Lady Elizabeth Hamilton, who married Edward Smith-Stanley, 12th Earl of Derby). Lord Derby is not, however, an heir to the Marquessate of Douglas and its subsidiary titles, which would pass to the heir male (a junior-line descendant of one of the Earls of Angus, as the heirs male of the body of the 3rd Duchess are the only remaining heirs male of the body of the 1st Marquess of Douglas).  He is also not an heir to the Dukedom of Brandon or the Barony of Dutton, which are limited to the heirs male of the body of the 3rd Duchess.

Family Tree

See also
 Clan Hamilton
 Clan Douglas
 Earl of Angus
 Earl of Arran (Scotland)
 Earl of Orkney
 Earl of Selkirk
 Lord Abernethy
 Hamilton Palace and Hamilton Mausoleum
 Brodick Castle
 Lennoxlove House
 Holyrood Palace
 Duke of Abercorn
 Lord Belhaven and Stenton

References

Works cited

External links
 Hamilton family portraits
 Lennoxlove House
 Palace of Holyroodhouse

 
Dukedoms in the Peerage of Scotland
 
Lists of Scottish people
North Lanarkshire
People associated with South Lanarkshire
Peerages created with special remainders
Noble titles created in 1643